Southshore is an eastern suburb within Christchurch, New Zealand. It is rich in wildlife and forestry. Although it was called Southshore informally for some years previously, it was named formally in 1955. The area was damaged in the 2011 Christchurch earthquake and 198 properties were zoned red.

Demographics
Southshore is part of the South New Brighton SA2 statistical area.

It had a population of 1,041 at the 2018 New Zealand census, a decrease of 96 people (-8.4%) since the 2013 census, and a decrease of 354 people (-25.4%) since the 2006 census. There were 417 households. There were 519 males and 525 females, giving a sex ratio of 0.99 males per female, with 198 people (19.0%) aged under 15 years, 162 (15.6%) aged 15 to 29, 498 (47.8%) aged 30 to 64, and 183 (17.6%) aged 65 or older.

Ethnicities were 94.2% European/Pākehā, 12.1% Māori, 3.2% Pacific peoples, 2.6% Asian, and 3.2% other ethnicities (totals add to more than 100% since people could identify with multiple ethnicities).

Although some people objected to giving their religion, 59.7% had no religion, 28.8% were Christian, 0.3% were Hindu, 0.6% were Muslim, 0.9% were Buddhist and 2.6% had other religions.

Of those at least 15 years old, 195 (23.1%) people had a bachelor or higher degree, and 117 (13.9%) people had no formal qualifications. The employment status of those at least 15 was that 408 (48.4%) people were employed full-time, 162 (19.2%) were part-time, and 30 (3.6%) were unemployed.

Christchurch earthquakes 
Southshore was hit hard by the 4 September 2010 Canterbury and 22 February 2011 Christchurch earthquakes. Damage was caused to houses and land. Southshore was initially put into the orange zone before the beach side was zoned green on 29 October 2011.  The estuary side remains in the orange zone awaiting land announcements to decide if it is financially worth repairing and rebuilding on that land due to the extensive damage caused by the two main shakes and also the ongoing aftershocks.

In August 2011, residents were informed that they could expect a land zoning decision within six weeks. Later that month, it was announced that the decision would be released in September. In mid September, the decision was delayed due to "unexpected complexity". On 12 October, Gerry Brownlee as Earthquake Recovery Minister apologised for the delay and asked for another two weeks of patience. The 29 October 2011 decision split Southshore into two zones. In November, Brooklands was zoned red, but the decision for Southshore was further delayed. In mid December, Brownlee wrote to residents, stating that a decision would be made "prior to Christmas". On 23 March 2012, land zoning decisions were made for the remaining areas of Linwood, Richmond and the Avon Loop within the Central City, while Brownlee wrote to the 401 Southshore home owners stating that they should have a decision during April. By the end of April, Roger Sutton as Chief Executive of the Canterbury Earthquake Recovery Authority issued an apology to residents for further delays. The decision was released on 18 May 2012, with 198 of the properties zoned red and the remaining 203 properties allowed to be lived in.

References

Suburbs of Christchurch